Diepenbeek railway station is a railway stop on the Hasselt–Liège railway in the Belgian municipality of Diepenbeek.

The station was opened in 1856 along the new railway line between Hasselt and Maastricht. In the end of the 1950s, the station lost importance and was closed.

After the Limburg University Center was established near the former station in 1973, there was an increasing demand from students to reopen the station. This finally happened in 1991, when a stop was opened at the site of the former station.

In the context of the Spartacus plan, all level crossings in Diepenbeek will be removed, including the one in Stationsstraat. They will be replaced by passenger underpasses.

Services

Week

Weekend

References

Railway stations in Limburg (Belgium)
Railway stations opened in 1856
Railway stations in Belgium